Irondequoit  is a town (and census-designated place) in Monroe County, New York, United States. As of 2019, the coterminous town-CDP had a total population of 50,055. Irondequoit is a suburb of the city of Rochester, lying just north and east of the city limits. The name is of Iroquois origin and means "where the land meets the water".

History 
In 1687 Marquis de Denonville led an army of French soldiers and Huron warriors on a punitive expedition against the Iroquois through Irondequoit Bay, beginning the long enmity between the Iroquois and the French.

After the American Revolution, this area was part of the Phelps and Gorham Purchase. The Town of Irondequoit was founded in 1839 when it separated from the Town of Brighton.

During the last part of the 19th century, the north edge of the town was developed as a tourist and vacation area for the City of Rochester residents, and was once known as the "Coney Island of Western New York."

After World War II, Irondequoit experienced significant population growth, with returning veterans looking for housing. Irondequoit became the first suburb in Monroe County to see substantial migration of residents from the City of Rochester, with the population growing from 23,376 in 1940 to 55,337 in 1960, a remarkable 136% increase. Irondequoit remained the most-populated suburb in Monroe County until the 1970s, when it was surpassed by the Town of Greece, a community with three times the land area of Irondequoit.

In 1965, Irondequoit became part of civil rights history by being part of the first totally voluntary desegregation program in U.S. history. The Urban Suburban Interdistrict Transfer Program, which still operates today, was begun with 25 first graders from the inner city of Rochester who embarked on their K-12 education in the West Irondequoit school district. Ultimately, 15 of the original 25 students graduated together in 1977 as part of the first graduating class ever to go through a full 12 years of voluntary desegregation. The achievement was acknowledged in a letter from the White House and a notation in the U.S. Congressional Record. The program has continued to expand and now includes additional suburban districts that are part of the Rochester metropolitan area.

In 1991, Irondequoit established a sister city relationship with Poltava, in Ukraine. Poltava is an Eastern Ukrainian city once known as "the Soul of Ukraine". The initiative was spearheaded by Irondequoit Town Supervisor Fred Lapple.  His appointed Committe Chair, Tamara Denysenko, identified Poltava, Ukraine as Irondequoit's chosen Sister City.  This was supported by the larger Ukrainian community in Irondequoit, including Bogdan Khomiakov, a small business owner living in Irondequoit whose father had immigrated from Poltava.

Geography

The town lies between the Genesee River on the west and Irondequoit Bay on the east. The north border of the town is defined by the shoreline of Lake Ontario. Because it is bounded by water on three sides, it is considered a geographical headland. Irondequoit is bordered by the city of Rochester to the west and south, the town of Brighton southeast, and the towns of Webster and Penfield to the east.

An unusual boundary exists between the Town of Irondequoit and the adjacent City of Rochester. The result is that the City of Rochester claims the entire eastern shore of the Genesee, and the border of the Town of Irondequoit never reaches the river.

Similarly, the northern half of Durand-Eastman Park (including Durand Beach) lies within the city's borders, along with a narrow strip running along Culver Road for approximately  southward to Norton Street. This leads to much confusion, even among long-term residents, about whether places such as Seneca Park or Durand Park lie within the Town of Irondequoit or the City of Rochester. Seneca Park was annexed by the City of Rochester in 1891, and Durand Eastman Park was given to the city in 1908.

Demographics

As of the census of 2000, there were 52,354 people, 22,247 households, and 14,327 families residing in the coterminous town-CDP. The population density was 3,447.4 per square mile (1,330.7/km2). There were 23,037 housing units at an average density of 1,516.9 per square mile (585.6/km2). The racial makeup of the town was 93.03% White, 3.55% Black or African American, 0.15% Native American, 0.98% Asian, 0.02% Pacific Islander, 1.02% from other races, and 1.25% from two or more races. Hispanic or Latino of any race were 3.06% of the population.

There were 22,247 households, out of which 26.7% had children under the age of 18 living with them, 50.7% were married couples living together, 10.4% had a female householder with no husband present, and 35.6% were non-families. 30.8% of all households were made up of individuals, and 16.7% had someone living alone who was 65 years of age or older. The average household size was 2.32 and the average family size was 2.91.

In the town, the population was spread out, with 21.9% under the age of 18, 5.2% from 18 to 24, 26.6% from 25 to 44, 23.7% from 45 to 64, and 22.5% who were 65 years of age or older. The median age was 43 years. For every 100 females, there were 85.4 males. For every 100 females age 18 and over, there were 81.1 males.

The median income for a household in the town was $45,276, and the median income for a family was $55,493. Males had a median income of $41,463 versus $30,937 for females. The per capita income for the town was $23,638. About 3.8% of families and 5.4% of the population were below the poverty line, including 6.6% of those under age 18 and 6.8% of those age 65 or over.

Government

Irondequoit is governed by a Town Board consisting of a Supervisor and four councilpersons. All members of the Town Board serve the entire town, and are elected at-large by voters. The Supervisor serves a two-year term, while councilpersons serve a four-year term.

Irondequoit is known for its colonial-style Town Hall, built in 1951. It was completed with funds that had been previously set aside for two decades. It was listed on the historical registry in 2010 by the Irondequoit Historical Preservation Commission.

Current Members of the Town Board
Supervisor: Rory Fitzpatrick (Republican) - 2022–Present
Councilperson: John Perticone (Democrat) - 2007–Present
Councilperson: Peter Wehner (Democrat) - 2016–Present
Councilperson: Kimie Romeo (Democrat) - 2018–Present
Councilperson: Patrina Freeman (Democrat) - 2020–Present

Notable people 
The following notable people were either born in Irondequoit or were long-time residents:

Richard Brookhiser - historian and biographer of various American founding fathers, is a 1973 graduate of Irondequoit High School.
Cito Culver - first round draft pick for the New York Yankees
Steve Gadd - drummer who has played with Paul Simon, Eric Clapton, Frank Sinatra, and others. His most famous work was his drum work on Fifty Ways to Leave Your Lover.
Tom Golisano - founder of Paychex and a three-time New York State gubernatorial candidate is a graduate of Irondequoit High School. He was also the owner of the Buffalo Sabres hockey team from 2003 to 2011.
Kent Syverud - 12th Chancellor and President of Syracuse University

Education
Irondequoit is served by the West Irondequoit and East Irondequoit central school districts.

Additionally, there are several schools with religious affiliations:
Archangel School (Roman Catholic) operated by private individuals
Bay Knoll School operated by the Seventh-day Adventists
Derech Hatorah for Jewish education
Bishop Kearney High School (independently owned) but affiliated with the Diocese of Rochester.  
Two schools operated by the Roman Catholic Diocese of Rochester:
Saint Kateri School
Saint Ambrose Academy

Irondequoit is also the home of satellite campuses of two institutions of higher learning:
Empire State College's Genesee Valley Learning Center
Everest Institute's Rochester campus

References

External links

	

Census-designated places in Monroe County, New York
New York (state) populated places on the Genesee River
Rochester metropolitan area, New York
Towns in Monroe County, New York
Census-designated places in New York (state)
Populated places on Lake Ontario in the United States
1839 establishments in New York (state)
Populated places established in 1839